The 1950 National Division was the 11th and last edition of the Turkish National Division. Fenerbahçe won their 6th title.

Participants

Beşiktaş - Istanbul Football League, 1st
Fenerbahçe - Istanbul Football League, 2nd
Galatasaray - Istanbul Football League, 3rd
Vefa - Istanbul Football League, 4th
Gençlerbirliği - Ankara Football League, 1st
Ankara Demirspor - Ankara Football League, 2nd
Göztepe - İzmir Football League, 1st
Altay - İzmir Football League, 2nd

League standings

Results

References
 Erdoğan Arıpınar; Tevfik Ünsi Artun, Cem Atabeyoğlu, Nurhan Aydın, Ergun Hiçyılmaz, Haluk San, Orhan Vedat Sevinçli, Vala Somalı (June 1992). Türk Futbol Tarihi (1904-1991) vol.1, Page(84), Türkiye Futbol Federasyonu Yayınları.

Turkish National Division Championship seasons
1949–50 in Turkish football
Turkey